Robert Beeson is a music executive. He founded Essential Records in 1992, home to artists Jars of Clay and Third Day, along with Caedmon's Call, Bebo Norman and FFH. He also created the City On a Hill series. He became Senior VP A&R for Provident Music Group after they bought Essential, working with Casting Crowns, and Michael W. Smith.

He left Provident Music Group in 2006 and formed iShine Records, a faith-based music/multimedia company geared specifically towards the tween marketplace.

He lives in Franklin, Tennessee, with his 3 daughters.

References
Notes

Bibliography
Robert Beeson at LinkedIn

1966 births
American music industry executives
Living people